This is a list of cricketers who have played first-class, List A or Twenty20 cricket for Gujarat cricket team.  Seasons given are first and last seasons; the player did not necessarily play in all the intervening seasons. Players in bold have played international cricket.

A
Essof Ashroff, 1953/54

C
Nilesh Chaudhary, 2007/08

D
Bharat Desai, 1959/60
J. Desai, 1971/72
, 1988/89
Walter D'Souza
Fakir Dungaria, 1991/92

G
Dhiren Gajjar, 1978/79, 1981/82

K
HA Khan, 1953/54

M
Hiralal Macchi, 1981/82

Z
Pankaj Zaveri
Hasubhai Zinzuwadia

References 

Gujarat cricketers

cricketers